Karin Stoiber, née Rudolf (born 6 July 1943 in Buchau, Nazi Germany (now Bochov, Czech Republic)) was the spouse of the minister-president of Bavaria from 1993 to 2007.

Karin Stoiber is the wife of the former prime minister of the state of Bavaria and chairman of the Christian Social Union (CSU), Dr. Edmund Stoiber. The Stoibers are currently living in Wolfratshausen, Southern Bavaria.

They have been married since 23 February 1968. They have three children together. Until the birth of her first daughter in 1971, she worked as a bank clerk.

Her special interest is helping deaf people. She is the patron of the "Kinderhospiz Allgäu".

External links 
 Official Homepage of Edmund Stoiber (German)

1943 births
Living people
Sudeten German people
German people of German Bohemian descent
People from Karlovy Vary District